CFW may refer to:
 CFW, the SAME code for a Coastal Flood Warning
 CFW Communications, now nTelos
 Campaign for the Feminine Woman, later Concern for Family and Womanhood, a British anti-feminist organisation
 Confederation of Filipino Workers
 Custom firmware